The 1933 season was the Hawthorn Football Club's 9th season in the Victorian Football League and 32nd overall. Arthur Rademacher stepped in as coach after appointed coach Fred Phillips died on the eve of the season. Rademacher coached the first four games before Hawthorn appointed Bill Twomey, Sr. as coach for the rest of the season.

Fixture

Premiership Season

Ladder

References

Hawthorn Football Club seasons